Nadrichne may refer to the following places in Ukraine:

Nadrichne, Odesa Oblast, village in Bolhrad Raion
Nadrichne, Berezhany urban hromada, Ternopil Raion, Ternopil Oblast
Nadrichne, Zolotnyky rural hromada, Ternopil Raion, Ternopil Oblast
Nadrichne, Volyn Oblast, village in Kamin-Kashyrskyi Raion